Béla Kovács (born 30 March 1977 in Budapest) is a Hungarian former footballer who played as a midfielder.

External links

1977 births
Living people
Hungarian footballers
Hungary international footballers
Hungarian expatriate footballers
Nemzeti Bajnokság I players
Veikkausliiga players
Cypriot First Division players
Cypriot Second Division players
Football League (Greece) players
Budapest Honvéd FC players
Ferencvárosi TC footballers
Vaasan Palloseura players
Alki Larnaca FC players
Ergotelis F.C. players
ASIL Lysi players
Nyíregyháza Spartacus FC players
Expatriate footballers in Finland
Expatriate footballers in Cyprus
Expatriate footballers in Greece
Association football midfielders
Footballers from Budapest